Orlando Casares was an Argentinean retired football coach who is last known to have managed  Kaizer Chiefs in South Africa. Orlando also managed the Nicaragua National team in 1980 - 1981. He is the father of Matias Casares, the president of the Haitian Soccer Association based in Fort Lauderdale.

South Africa

Assuming the role of Kaizer Chiefs head coach in 1983, Casares steered the Amakhosi to that year's Datsun Challenge, but had an enmity with former coach Banks Setlhodi and poor league results which eventually got him dismissed. The Argentine was also unpopular with the Kaizer Chiefs players who questioned his qualifications.

References 

Argentine expatriate football managers
Expatriate soccer managers in South Africa
Argentine football managers
Argentine expatriate sportspeople in South Africa
Kaizer Chiefs F.C. managers
Dynamos F.C. (South Africa) managers